Glaucias or Glaukias may refer to:

People
Glaucias of Aegina, sculptor 5th century BC
Glaucias (physician, 4th century BC) of Hephaestion
Glaucias (physician, 3rd century BC), a Greek physician of the Empiric school who wrote commentaries on  Hippocrates
Glaucias of Macedon, general of Alexander
Glaucias of Taulantii, Illyrian king 
Glaucias of Athens, rhetorician 1st century  AD

Insects
 Glaucias (bug), a genus in tribe Nezarini
Glaucias amyoti, a species of shield bug from Australasia

See also
Glaucus (disambiguation)